Mathieu-Richard-Auguste Henrion (b. Metz, 19 June 1805; d. Aix-en-Provence, September, 1862) was a Baron, French magistrate, historian, and journalist. After completing his studies in law, he became a member of the Paris Bar as avocat à la cour royale. Under the July Monarchy he was made assistant librarian at the Bibliothèque Mazarine; Napoleon III appointed him counsellor at the court of appeals of La Guadeloupe, whence he was transferred in the same capacity to the court of Aix, a position which he occupied until his death.

He contributed for the greater part of his life to Catholic and royalist periodicals—first to the Drapeau Blanc, then the Journal de l'Instruction Publique, and to others of lesser importance. Finally, in 1840, he assumed the editorship of L'Ami de la Religion, which in 1848 came under the control of Abbe Felix Dupanloup. Besides his numerous articles in periodicals, Henrion wrote many books which show his Catholic and royalist convictions - he belonged to the generation of fiery French Ultramontanes of the middle of the nineteenth century. His principal works are:

Histoire des ordres religieux (Paris, 1831) 
Tableau des congrégations religieuses formées en France depuis le XVIIe siècle (Paris, 1831)
Histoire de la papauté(History of the Papacy), Paris, 1832 
Histoire générale de l'Eglise pendant les XVIIIe et XIXe siècles (Paris, 1836) 
Histoire littéraire de la France au moyen-age (Paris, 1837)
Vie et travaux apostoliques de M. de Quélen, archevêque de Paris (Paris, 1840) 
Histoire generale de l'Eglise (Paris, 1843-)
Vie de M. Frayssinous (Paris, 1844) 
Vie du Père Loriquet (Paris, 1845).

References

Attribution
 Cites sources:
Lagrange, Vie Mgr. Dupanloup (Paris, 1886)
L'ami de la Religion, CIII, CIV, CXXXIX, CXL, etc.
Houtin, La controverse de l'apostolicite des eglises en France au XIXe siecle (Paris, 1903), 41, 236, 307
Arbellot, Documents inedits sur l'apostolat de S. Martial et sur l'antiquite des eglises de France (Paris, 1862)Annales de philosophie chrétienne'' (March, 1861), III, 5 sqq., 165-82

1805 births
1862 deaths
19th-century French historians
French male non-fiction writers
19th-century French male writers